Deepak Chakraborty (better known in film career as Chiranjeet Chakraborty; born 2 November 1955), is an Indian actor and director in the Bengali film industry located in Kolkata, West Bengal. He is also a politician and a Member of the Legislative Assembly of Government of West Bengal. He was born on 2 November 1955 at Kolkata. He has got the BFJA Award for his film Abaidha in 2002. The film was directed by Gul Bahar Singh.

Chiranjeet completed his Higher Secondary from Mitra Institution (Main). He studied B.E. in Architecture at Jadavpur University, but did not appear for his final examination. He has worked for Desh magazine and as a newsreader on TV. He is also a famous stage artist. He is married and has a daughter.

He made his debut with the 1981 film Sonay Sohaga. But it did not make his career. He gained popularity after starring in Anjan Choudhury's 1984 film Shotru. His first solo hit was the 1985 film Antarale. After that, he had a series of hits like Pratikar, Paapi, Paap Punyo, Beder Meye Joshna, Amarkantak, Jibon Joubon, Bhoy, Shaitan, Pennam Kolkata, Beyadap,  Tridhara,  Jiban Yoddha, Phiriye Dao,  Agnitrishna, Shakti, Rakta Nadir Dhara, Tomar Rakte Amar Shohag, Trishul, Chotushkone, etc. 

He got a turning point after starring in Rituparno Ghosh's 2000 film Bariwali. He is considered to be one of the most successful actors in the history of Bengali Cinema.

Political career
Chiranjeet contested the 2011 West Bengal state assembly election in Barasat constituency for All India Trinamool Congress and won the seat. As of June 2020, he is a Member of the Legislative Assembly of Government of West Bengal. In March 2021, Mamata Banerjee announced Chiranjeet would contest from Barasat Vidan Sabha constituency in the West Bengal Legislative Assembly Election 2021. He is the candidate of AITC from Barasat since 2011.[3] He once again regained the Barasat constituency as AITC candidate after defeating BJP candidate Sankar Chatterjee with a margin of 23,783 votes as declared on 2 May 2021. 
Chiranjeet Chakraborty Comments On Partha Chatterjee Arrest

Film career

As director
Maryada (1989)
Phiriye Dao (1994)
Sansar Sangram (1995)
Kencho Khunrte Keute (1995)
Bhoy (1996)
Bastir Meye Radha (2000)
Manush Amanush (2002)

As actor

Sonay Sohaga (1981)
Sandhan (1982)
Prafulla (1982)
Din Jaye (1983)
Ashlilatar Daye (1983)
Shatru (1984)
Samarpita (1984)
Sonar Sansar (1985)
Harishchandra Shaibya (1985)
Antarale (1985)
Prem O Paap (1986)
Madhumoy (1986)
Jiban (1986)
Artanad (1986)
Amar Kantak (film) (1986)
Pratikar (1987)
Paap Punya (1987)
Mouna Mukhar (1987)
Gayak (1987)
Pratik (1988)
Madhuganjer Sumati (1988)
Hirer Shikal (1988)
Boba Sanai (1988)
Aghat (1988)
Tufan (1989)
Shatrupaksha (1989)
Nishibadhu (1989)
Maryada (1989)
Mahapith Tarapith (1989)
Asha (1989)
Agnitrishna (1989)
Papi (1990)
Jowar Bhanta (1990)
Gharer Bou (1990)
Sindur (1991)
Beder Meye Josna (1991)
Shaitan (1992)
Rakte Lekha (1992)
Pitrireen (1992)
Pennam Kolkata (1992)
Bedenir Prem (1992)
Tomar Rakte Aamar Sohag (1993)
Shanka (1993)
Shakti (1993)
Samparka (1993)
Maan Samman (1993)
Kanyadan (1993)
Ghar Sansar (1993)
Rakta Nadir Dhara (1994)
Phiriye Dao (1994)
Lal Paan Bibi (1994)
Danga (1994)
Biswas Abiswas (1994)
Atikram (1994)
Sansar Sangram (1995)
Rakhal Raja (1995)
Prem Sanghat (1995)
Naginkanya (1995)
Mashal (1995)
Kumari Maa (1995)
Kencho Khunrte Keute (1995)
Jiban Yoddha (1995)
Abirbhab (1995)
Tridhara (1996)
Joy Bijoy (1996)
Bhoy
Bhai Amar Bhai (1996)
Beyadap (1996)
Yoddha (1997)
Sedin Chaitramas (1997)
Sabar Upare Maa (1997)
Pita Mata Santan (1997)
Nishpap Asami (1997)
Jiban Jouban (1997)
Chandragrahan (1997)
Mayer Dibyi (1998)
Lola Lusi (1998)
Bishnu Narayan (1998)
Sindur Khela (1999)
Sankha Sindurer Dibyi (1999)
Rajdanda (1999)
Mastan Raja (1999)
Dadabhai (1999)
Trishul (2000)
Rupasi Dohai Tomar (2000)
Dharma Adharma (2000)
Debanjali (2000)
Chakrabyuha (2000)
Bastir Meye Radha (2000)
Srimoti Bhayonkari (2001)
Prem Pratigya (2001)
Ostad (2001)
Mastermasai (2001)
Hatiyar (2001)
Bhalobasar Rajprasade (2001)
Bariwali (2001)
Manush Amanush (2002)
Inquilaab (2002)
Abaidha (2002)
Chor O Bhagoban (2003)
Atotayee (2004)
Chore Chore Mastuto Bhai (2005)
Abhinetri (2006)
Antarotamo (2008)
1 No. Plum Villa (2009)
Sesh Sanghat (2009)
Gudly (2010)
Antarbas (2010)
Inception (2010)
Rose Craze Rose (2010)
Jibon Rang Berang (2011)
Boss (2013)
10th July (film) (2014)
Bindaas (2014)
Kusum Tumi Amar (2013)- Unreleased
Chotushkone (2014)
Cornel (2013)- Unreleased
Monihara (2015)
Abby Sen (2015)
 Shororipu (2016)
 Kiriti Roy (2016)
Chaamp (2017)
Boss 2: Back to Rule (2017)
Jagga Jasoos (2017) (Hindi)
Rongberonger Korhi (2018)
Baccha Shoshur (2019)
Surjo Prithibir Chardike Ghore(2019) 
Shororipu 2: Jotugriho (2021)
Dhumketu (upcoming)
Unicorn  (2022)
Daawat-e-Biryani (upcoming)

Awards
 Kalakar Awards-Best Actor Award for Ghar Sansar in 1993.
 Kalakar Awards-Best Director Award for Sansar Sangram in 1996.
 Kalakar Awards-Best Actor Award in 2000.
 Kalakar Awards-Best Actor Award for Manus Amanus in 2003.
 Kalakar Awards-Best Actor Award(Television) for Mushkil Assan in 2006.
 BFJA Awards-Best Actor Award for Abaidha in 2003.
 Bharat Nirman Award in 2011.

References

External links
 

Living people
Male actors in Bengali cinema
Bengali male actors
Male actors from Kolkata
Recipients of the Padma Shri in arts
Indian male film actors
20th-century Indian male actors
21st-century Indian male actors
20th-century Indian film directors
21st-century Indian film directors
Bengali film directors
Film directors from Kolkata
1955 births
Jadavpur University alumni